Hardy Krüger (born Eberhard August Franz Ewald Krüger; 12 April 1928 – 19 January 2022) was a German actor and author, who appeared in more than 60 films from 1944 onwards. After becoming a film star in Germany in the 1950s, Krüger increasingly turned to roles in international films such as Hatari!, The Flight of the Phoenix,  The Wild Geese, Sundays and Cybele,  A Bridge Too Far, The Battle of Neretva, The Secret of Santa Vittoria, The Red Tent, The One That Got Away, and Barry Lyndon.

Hardy Krüger's life story made him a convinced and committed anti-fascist.

Early life 
Hardy Krüger was born in Wedding, Berlin, in 1928, the son of Max and Auguste (Meier) Krüger. Krüger's parents were ardent Nazis and he stated in a 2016 interview that he was "raised to love Hitler." From 1941, he attended an elite Adolf Hitler School at the Ordensburg Sonthofen. At the age of 15, Hardy made his film début in Alfred Weidenmann's The Young Eagles. It was here that he met the eminent actor Hans Söhnker, who became a friend for life. Söhnker was a covert anti-Nazi, who gave refuge to those fleeing the regime. He made a point of educating Krüger, who assisted his friend with delivering messages to fugitives.

In March 1945, Krüger was assigned to the 38th SS Division Nibelungen and was drawn into heavy combat. The 16-year-old Krüger was ordered to shoot at an American squad. When he refused, he was sentenced to death for cowardice, but another SS officer countermanded the order. Krüger described this experience as his break with Nazism. He afterwards served as a messenger for the SS, but later escaped and hid out in Tyrol until the end of the war. He was a member of the Amadeu Antonio Foundation and frequently spoke publicly against extremism and for democracy, citing his own experiences.

Life and work 

Krüger continued his acting career after the Second World War with small stage roles. He could not afford to attend an acting school. He established himself as a German film star during the 1950s, appearing in Die Jungfrau auf dem Dach (1953), the German version of The Moon is Blue, directed by Otto Preminger. Krüger sought international roles because he found the German Heimatfilm cinema of the 1950s rather shallow. He first came to the attention of English language audiences in the 1957 British war film The One That Got Away, the story of Franz von Werra, the only German prisoner of war to escape from Allied custody and return to Germany.

In 1960, Krüger bought Ngorongoro, a farm in the Tanganyika Territory (now part of Tanzania), which he owned for 13 years. Ngorongoro and the area around it served as the setting for the film Hatari! (1962), directed by Howard Hawks, in which Krüger appeared with John Wayne. He fell in love with the area so much during filming that he decided he wanted to live there.

Fluent in German, English, and French, Kruger worked in numerous European and American films. He had the leading role in the Oscar-winning Sundays and Cybele (1962), and a key role as the German model aircraft designer in the original version of The Flight of the Phoenix (1965). Other films he acted in include the comedy-drama The Secret of Santa Vittoria (1969), in which he played a German officer during the Second World War trying to find hidden wine in a small Italian town; Stanley Kubrick's Barry Lyndon with Ryan O'Neal (1975); Richard Attenborough's A Bridge Too Far, sharing a scene with Laurence Olivier, 1977; and The Wild Geese with Richard Burton (1978). Because of his stereotypical "Teutonic" look (blond hair and blue eyes), Krüger often played German soldiers. This was somewhat ironic, as he thought that "war films were boring and should not be made". Indeed, his own experiences with the war provided enough trauma for him to be against the glorification of it.

In the late 1980s, Krüger largely retired from acting and became a writer, including novels, travel books and memoirs. He published 16 books from 1970 onwards. Four of them have been translated into English. He also directed a number of European television documentaries showing his travels around the world.

Personal life and death 

Krüger met his first wife, Renate Densow (1918–2006), in a hotel lobby when he was just 16 years old. He had been billeted there with the army, while she was celebrating an acting success. They spent the night together and talked about the future together, though the war pulled them apart. He tracked her down again after the war had ended, and found that he had fathered a child Christiane Krüger (born 1945). They married afterwards, although the marriage broke down in 1964.

His second marriage, to the Italian painter Francesca Marazzi, lasted from 1964 to 1977. He and Marazzi had two children, Malaika Krüger (born 1967) and Hardy Krüger Jr. (born 1968).  In the 1960s and 1970s, Krüger lived at the ranch "Hatari Lodge" (where the film Hatari! was filmed) at the foot of Mount Meru, Tanzania.

Krüger married his third wife, Anita Park, in 1978. They lived in California and Hamburg. This marriage lasted, as it was around this time that he also retired from acting and was able to spend more time at home.

Krüger died at his home in Palm Springs, California, on 19 January 2022, at the age of 93.

Selected filmography 

Source:

  (Young Eagles) (1944) as Heinz Baum, called "Bäumchen" (little tree)
 I'll Never Forget That Night (1949) as Eugen Schröter 
 Kätchen für alles (1949) as acting student
 Das Fräulein und der Vagabund (1949) as Karl
 The Girl from the South Seas (1950) as Richard Kirbach
 Insel ohne Moral (1950) as Manfred
 You Have to Be Beautiful (1951) as Juppi Holunder Jr.
 My Friend the Thief (1951) as Bimbo
 My Name is Niki (1952) as Paul
 I Can't Marry Them All (1952) as Edi
 Illusion in a Minor Key (1952) as Paul Alsbacher
 The Moon Is Blue (1953) as Tourist (uncredited)
 Die Jungfrau auf dem Dach (1953) as Donald Gresham 
 As Long as You're Near Me (1953) as Stefan Berger
 Must We Get Divorced? (1953) as Andreas von Doerr
 I and You (1953) as Peter Erdmann
 The Last Summer (1954) as Rikola Valbo
 The Blue Danube (1955) as König Richard
 Heaven Is Never Booked Up (1955) as Michael
 Alibi (1955) as Harald Meinhardt
 Liane, Jungle Goddess (1956) as Thoren
 Die Christel von der Post (1956) as Horst Arndt, assistant police detective
  (1957) as Klaus Burkhardt
 The Fox of Paris (1957) as Capt. Fürstenwerth
 The One That Got Away (1957) as Franz Von Werra
 Confess, Doctor Corda (1958) as Dr. Fred Corda
 Bachelor of Hearts (1958) as Wolf Hauser
 The Rest Is Silence (1959) as John H. Claudius
 Blind Date (1959) as Jan-Van Rooyer
 The Goose of Sedan (1959) as Fritz Brösicke
  (Bumerang) (1960) as Robert Wegner
 Taxi for Tobruk (1961) as le capitaine Ludwig von Stegel
 Two Among Millions (1961) as Karl

 The Dream of Lieschen Mueller (1961, cameo) as Autograph hunter
 Hatari! (1962) as Kurt Muller
 Sundays and Cybele (Les dimanches de ville d'Avray) (1962) as Pierre
 Three Fables of Love (1962) as El rubio (segment "La mort et le bûcheron")
  (1964) as Frank Willes
 The Uninhibited (1965) as Vincent
 Le Chant du monde (1965) as Antonio
 The Flight of the Phoenix (1965) as Heinrich Dorfmann
 The Defector (1966) as Counselor Peter Heinzmann
  (1967) as Carl
  (1968) as Alfred Stanke
 The Lady of Monza (1969) as Father Paolo Arrigone
 The Battle of Neretva (1969) as Kranzer
 The Secret of Santa Vittoria (1969) as Captain von Prum
 The Red Tent (1969) as Aviator Lundborg
  (1971, TV miniseries) as Jim Ellis
 What the Peeper Saw (1972) as Paul
  (1973) as Eric Lambrecht
 Paper Tiger (1975) as Müller
 Barry Lyndon (1975) as Captain Potzdorf
  (1976) as Potato Fritz
 The Spy Who Never Was (Tod eines Fremden) (1976) as Arthur Hersfeld
  (1977) as Commissare Bolar
 A Bridge Too Far (1977) as Generalmajor der Waffen-SS Karl Ludwig
 The Wild Geese (1978) as Lt. Pieter Coetzee
 Blue Fin (1978) as Bill Pascoe
 High Society Limited (1982) as Harms
 Wrong Is Right (1982) as Helmut Unger
 The Inside Man (1984) as Mandell
 War and Remembrance (1988–1989, TV miniseries) as Field Marshal Erwin Rommel
 The Family (2011, TV Movie) as Victor Frey (final film role)

Writings

Awards 

 1959 Bravo Otto (bronze)
 1960 Bravo Otto (silver)
 1983 Deutscher Filmpreis
 1986 Goldene Kamera
 2001 Bavarian Film Awards Honorary Award
 2001 Officier de la Légion d’Honneur
 2008 Bambi: Lifetime Achievement Award
 2009 Commander's Cross of the Order of Merit of the Federal Republic of Germany
 2011 Jupiter Award, Lifetime Achievement

See also 

 List of people from Berlin

References

External links 

 Biography of Hardy Krüger
 
 

1928 births
2022 deaths
20th-century German male actors
21st-century German male actors
Male actors from Berlin
German male film actors
German male television actors
German prisoners of war in World War II held by the United States
Commanders Crosses of the Order of Merit of the Federal Republic of Germany
Officiers of the Légion d'honneur
German autobiographers
Waffen-SS personnel
German male non-fiction writers
People from Mitte
People condemned by Nazi courts
Deserters
Child soldiers in World War II
Writers from Berlin